Teignmouth Community School is coeducational primary and secondary school located over two sites in Teignmouth in the English county of Devon.

History

Primary department
The primary department of the school is located on Mill Lane in Teignmouth.

It was previously known as Inverteign Community Nursery and Primary School, and was administered as a community school by Devon County Council.

In March 2011 the school converted to academy status as part of the Osprey Learning Trust. The school was then renamed Teignmouth Community School. While legally separate from the secondary department, both schools are administered by the Osprey Learning Trust and share facilities and support staff.

Secondary department
The secondary department of the school is located on Exeter Road in Teignmouth.

Formerly two schools, Teignmouth Grammar School and Teignmouth Secondary Modern, located on the site of the current school. The two schools merged in 1979 to become Teignmouth High School.
The school campus was formed of five geographically separate areas. From the top of the hill being, Mount Everest (First Year accommodation and now the site of Teignmouth Police Station, School Sports Centre & new housing), The Upper School (formerly the Grammar School) Buildings, Legoland the Humanities block, West Lawn (the Secondary Modern) and Winterbourne, the Sixth Form centre which incorporated the Motor Engineering class. 
A further building was used for Special Needs and Support teaching, this former residential house bordered Exeter Street between the two main schools.

The early uniform being black trousers/skirt, white shirt, grey jumper and black blazer. The town crest appearing on the Blazer pocket. A tie of blue with bright yellow and red stripes was also mandatory, an identical tie was also occasionally worn by Larry Hagman in the 1980s TV Series Dallas.

From a peak student population in 1980, year numbers gradually declined and many temporary and duplicated structures were closed and demolished. These included the temporary class rooms to the South of West lawn, the Secondary modern external toilet block and drama blocks (at either end of the West Lawn 'top' playground) and the Special needs building.

In the late 1980s the name was changed to Teignmouth Community College.

The college became a specialist in maths and computing in 2004. A February 2010 Ofsted inspection report allocated the school an overall Grade 2 (Good) for its performance, with a Grade 1 (outstanding) on some points.

In March 2011 the school converted to academy status as part of the Osprey Learning Trust. The school was then renamed Teignmouth Community School. While legally separate from the primary department, both schools are administered by the Osprey Learning Trust and share facilities and support staff.

As well as the primary department of the school, feeder primary schools in the area include Our Lady and St Patricks RC primary school,  Hazeldown Primary, Inverteign community nursery and primary school, Bishopsteignton primary school, Stokeinteignhead and Shaldon primary schools.

Curriculum
Core subjects follow the National Curriculum with sixth form pupils following A-level, AS-level and BTEC courses. The college also offers vocational courses including NVQs in hairdressing and BTEC Diplomas in courses such as health and social care, information technology, travel and tourism, horticulture, construction and mechanics as well as many GCSE, A level and AS courses. Students from nearby Teign School also attend the college's vocational programmes.

Notable former pupils
 Matthew Bellamy, lead singer, guitarist and pianist of rock group Muse
 John Bainbridge, author and countryside campaigner
 Derek Cole, cricketer
 Dominic Howard, drummer, Muse
 Chris Wolstenholme, bassist, Muse
 Laura Rossi, composer

External links
 Teignmouth Old Grammarians' Association (alumni)

References

Academies in Devon
Secondary schools in Devon
Teignmouth
Primary schools in Devon